is a railway station on the Hakodate Main Line in Teine-ku, Sapporo, Hokkaido, Japan, operated by Hokkaido Railway Company (JR Hokkaido). The station is numbered "S08".

Lines
Inaho Station is served by the Hakodate Main Line.

Station layout
The station consists of two ground-level opposed side platforms serving two tracks. The station has automated ticket machines and Kitaca card readers (not equipped with regular ticket gates). The station is unattended.

Platforms

Adjacent stations

Surrounding area
 , (to Hakodate)
 JR Hokkaido Sapporo Operation Office
 Sapporo Driver's License Examination Hall
 Inaho Teine Police Station
 Inaho Teine Postal Office
 Teine Industrial-Park
 JR Bus Hokkaido, Teine Office

References

Railway stations in Japan opened in 1986
Teine-ku, Sapporo
Railway stations in Sapporo